Avgust Ipavec (born 2 June 1940 in Gorizia) is a Slovenian composer  and priest.  He graduated from the Music Academy in Ljubljana in 1974.

See also
List of Slovenian composers

References

1940 births
Living people
Slovenian composers
Male composers
20th-century Slovenian Roman Catholic priests
University of Ljubljana alumni
People from Gorizia
21st-century Slovenian Roman Catholic priests
Slovenian male musicians